The Cincinnati Reds' 1984 season consisted of the Cincinnati Reds attempting to win the National League West. It marked the return of Bob Howsam as General Manager, after Dick Wagner was fired during the 1983 season. The Reds finished in fifth place that year, as they escaped last place in the NL West, which the team had finished in 1982 and 1983.

Offseason 
 November 4, 1983: Brad Gulden was signed as a free agent with the Cincinnati Reds.
 November 12, 1983: Bob Owchinko was purchased by the Cincinnati Reds from the Pittsburgh Pirates.
 November 21, 1983: Steve Christmas was traded by the Reds to the Chicago White Sox for Fran Mullins.
 November 21, 1983: Wayne Krenchicki was purchased by the Reds from the Detroit Tigers.
 December 5, 1983: Fran Mullins was drafted from the Reds by the San Francisco Giants in the rule 5 draft.
 December 6, 1983: Tony Pérez was purchased by the Reds from the Philadelphia Phillies.
 December 7, 1983: Dave Parker was signed as a free agent by the Reds.

Regular season 
Reds pitcher Mario Soto endured two suspensions during the 1984 season for various incidents. In the first incident, on May 27 against the Chicago Cubs in Wrigley Field, third baseman Ron Cey hit what was originally ruled a home run down the left field line. Believing the ball had gone foul, Soto and Reds manager Vern Rapp disputed the call, and during the argument, Soto shoved third base umpire Steve Rippley, who had made the call.

After conferring, the umpires changed their decision and ruled it a foul ball, drawing a protest from the Cubs. However, for shoving Rippley, Soto was ejected, prompting him to charge the field and attack Cubs coach Don Zimmer, which triggered a ten-minute brawl. Four days later, National League president Chub Feeney suspended Mario Soto for five games. This game is also notable because Soto's opponent that day was future Hall of Fame Dennis Eckersley, who would go on to become a record-setting closer years later. "Eck", who was making his Cubs debut after being acquired in a trade with the Boston Red Sox, took the loss that day.

In the second incident, on June 16, the Reds were playing the Atlanta Braves in Atlanta. Soto threw several brushback pitches at Braves slugger Claudell Washington. Washington tossed his bat in the direction of Soto, appeared to go out to retrieve it, but instead walked toward the mound.  Umpire Lanny Harris attempted to restrain Washington. Harris was thrown to the ground. Soto used the distraction to punch Washington. Several of Washington's teammates attempted to hold Washington to the ground. While they were doing that, Soto fired the baseball into the crowd of players, striking Braves coach Joe Pignatano. He was suspended three games for this incident; Washington received a five-game suspension for shoving Lanny Harris.

The Reds drew the two smallest attendances in the history of Riverfront Stadium in 1984. Only 3,921 were on hand to see the Reds play the New York Mets on April 4, which was the record for the smallest crowd until May 31, when they lost to the Braves 7–1 in a makeup game from April, which drew just 2,472. That started a five-game series sweep of the Reds by Atlanta.

Prior to May 31, the Reds were 26-22 and trailed the San Diego Padres by a half-game in the NL West standings. From then until August 16, the Reds went 25-48 and had long left any hopes of winning the division. August 16 was the day the Reds brought Rose back as player-manager, as part of a trade with Montreal, as Rapp was fired.

Season standings

Record vs. opponents

Notable transactions 
 March 30, 1984: Dallas Williams was traded by the Reds to the Detroit Tigers for Charlie Nail (minors).
 August 16, 1984: Tom Lawless was traded by the Reds to the Montreal Expos for Pete Rose. Rose was named player-manager, as Vern Rapp was fired.

Roster

Player stats

Batting

Starters by position 
Note: Pos = Position; G = Games played; AB = At bats; H = Hits; Avg. = Batting average; HR = Home runs; RBI = Runs batted in

Other batters 
Note: G = Games played; AB = At bats; H = Hits; Avg. = Batting average; HR = Home runs; RBI = Runs batted in

Pitching

Starting pitchers 
Note: G = Games pitched; IP = Innings pitched; W = Wins; L = Losses; ERA = Earned run average; SO = Strikeouts

Other pitchers 
Note: G = Games pitched; IP = Innings pitched; W = Wins; L = Losses; ERA = Earned run average; SO = Strikeouts

Relief pitchers 
Note: G = Games pitched; W = Wins; L = Losses; SV = Saves; ERA = Earned run average; SO = Strikeouts

Farm system 

LEAGUE CHAMPIONS: Vermont

Notes

References 
1984 Cincinnati Reds season at Baseball Reference

Cincinnati Reds seasons
Cincinnati Reds season
Cinc